Pour Moi Ltd (generally known as Pour Moi) is a British multinational fashion, lingerie & swimwear retailer, which has its headquarters in Brighton, England. Pour Moi has one store based in Chester and sells online to over 50 countries worldwide.

History 
Pour Moi started in Macclesfield, Cheshire in 1998 and began selling bras via independent boutique Elle Lingerie in Rugby in 2005. They launched their first independent retail store in Macclesfield, followed by another shop in Chester soon afterwards, along with concessions in Figleaves and Littlewoods.

Pour Moi has grown its base of wholesale clients to include Asos, Next and Zalando and entered the US market with Bare Necessities in 2019.  In January 2019, Pour Moi acquired Charnos, Lepel & LF Intimates.  

Pour Moi launched its direct-to-consumer website in 2015, and a US website in December 2020.

Operations 
Pour Moi has a three channel model: wholesale, via partners such as Asos and Next; direct-to-consumer via its two websites, and via its store in Chester. 

Pour Moi works closely with celebrities & influencers, releasing edits with Love Island star India Reynolds, actress Helen Flanagan, television and media personality Vicky Pattison and Jess Wright from The Only Way is Essex. Its Energy Empower U/W Lightly Padded Sports Bra has received several recommendations from publications such as Closer, Good Housekeeping and Women's Running.

Management 
Michael Thomson is the CEO and Founder of Pour Moi.

Awards 
Pour Moi was shortlisted as a finalist in the 2021 Drapers Awards for Lingerie Brand of the Year and Best Marketing Campaign of 2021 with the #GetYourWiggleOn Campaign.

Pour Moi was shortlisted as a finalist in the Drapers Awards in 2019, in the Lingerie Brand of the Year category.

External links

References 

British companies established in 1998
Clothing brands of the United Kingdom
Companies based in Brighton
Lingerie brands